Roobee is an international financial technology company organized and existing under the laws of the British Virgin Islands, providing an AI-powered blockchain investment service. It is considered to be the first blockchain investment service developed for non-professional and private investors. The service enables its users to invest in loans, IPOs, venture capital, stocks, cryptocurrencies, ETFs and other options.

History
Roobee was founded in 2017 by Co-founder Artem Popov. August 2, 2018, during the pre-seed funding round, an anonymous investor, labeled by Bloomberg as 200M_trader invested $4.5m into Roobee. During the testing period Roobee had been used by over 5,000 people to invest an excess of US$15 million in Ethereum (ETH) into funds, venture, and blockchain projects.

References

Financial technology companies
Companies of the British Virgin Islands